The 1894 USFSA Football Championship was the 1st staging of the USFSA Football Championship. This was the very first recognized football championship to be played in France. The tournament was held on the road between 15 April and 6 May 1894.

The first competition featured just four Paris teams and was organized on a knockout basis with Standard Athletic Club becoming the French champions after beating The White Rovers 2–2 and 2–0 in the replay of the final.

Participants
The first national championship in team sports in France was the high schools rugby football championship in 1891. Its success prompted the Parisian clubs to start a championship for football as well. So, in 1894, it was decided to hold a "championship" among the volunteering football clubs of the U.S.F.S.A. The tournament gathered six teams, of which 4 were clubs from Paris, thus making it seem more of a championship of Paris rather than a French championship.

Format
The competition was played under a knockout cup system. Four clubs, Standard AC, International AC, White Rovers and CA Neuilly took part in a preliminary round, while Club Français and Cercle Pédestre d'Asnières received a bye to the semi-finals. All the matches took place on the Racing Club de France grounds in Levallois. The donater of the trophy was a wealthy sports-loving American businessman, James Gordon Bennett.

Bracket

Results

First round
Bye (2):
 CP Asnières
 Club Français

Note: At the last moment, the International AC withdrew, without the reason being known.

Semi-finals

Note: Rovers were "not expecting so much resistance", but end up scoring fifteen minutes from the end of the match by Mac Bain, on a corner kick taken by J. Wood, slightly helped by the wind.

Final

Replay

Winner

References

External link
RSSSF

USFSA Football Championship
1
France